Micromya is a genus of midges in the family Cecidomyiidae. The eleven described species are found in the holarctic, Neotropical, and Oriental realms. The genus was first described by Italian entomologist Camillo Rondani in 1840.

Species
Micromya brevisegmenta Mo, 1990
Micromya championii Grover, 1962
Micromya fusongensis Mo, 1990
Micromya gurbaxii Grover, 1970
Micromya indica Mani, 1937
Micromya kyushuensis Yukawa, 1967
Micromya longicauda Mo, 2000
Micromya longispina Mo, 1990
Micromya lucorum Rondani, 1840
Micromya orientalis Grover, 1962
Micromya transispina Mo, 1990

References

Cecidomyiidae genera

Insects described in 1840
Taxa named by Camillo Rondani